Dunnville Barrens is a Wisconsin Department of Natural Resources-designated State Natural Area featuring a jack pine barrens plant community on a wide, sandy Chippewa River terrace. Open areas in the barrens contain scattered shrubs, such as beaked hazelnut, with a groundlayer composed of dry sand prairie species, including little bluestem, purple prairie clover, and fameflower. The eastern portion of the site contains an open area of swale topography, with areas of both wet and dry prairie. Plant composition in this area is diverse and includes species such as big bluestem, cream baptisia (Baptisia bracteata), Michigan lily, downy gentian (Gentiana puberulenta), prairie alum-root (Heuchera richarsonii), and Culver's root. Uncommon animal species include gorgone checkerspot, Leonard's skipper, and five-lined skink.

Location and access 
Access is via 580th St., which meanders through the western portion of the site containing the jack pine barrens. The eastern portion of the site, containing the swale topography, can be accessed via 640th St.

References

External links 
Dunnville Barrens State Natural Area
Dunnville Wildlife Area
Google Map of Dunnville Barrens

Protected areas established in 2010
Protected areas of Dunn County, Wisconsin
State Natural Areas of Wisconsin
2010 establishments in Wisconsin